Porkkala is a Finnish name, which can mean:
Porkkalanniemi, a peninsula in Finland, often referred to simply as Porkkala
Porkkala Naval Base, a temporarily Soviet-held territory in Finland following World War II
FNS Porkkala, a Pansio-class minelayer
Veikko Porkkala (1908-2009), Finnish trade union activist

See also
Porkkalam, a 2010 Indian Tamil-language action film directed by Bandi Saroj Kumar
Porkkaalam, a 1997 Tamil-language film directed by Cheran